Apatow Productions (or The Apatow Company) is an American film and television production company founded by Judd Apatow in 1999.

The company's first television production was the comedy series Freaks and Geeks (1999–2000) and its first film production was the comedy film The 40-Year-Old Virgin (2005). Frequent collaborators include Adam McKay, Will Ferrell, Seth Rogen, and Jason Segel.

Films

Critical reception

Television

Critical reception

See also 
 Big Talk Productions
 Point Grey Pictures

References 

1999 establishments in California
American companies established in 1999
Companies based in Los Angeles
Entertainment companies based in California
Film production companies of the United States
Judd Apatow
Mass media companies established in 1999
Television production companies of the United States